Esfand may refer to:

Locations 
 Esfand, Gilan
 Esfand, Hormozgan
 Esfand, Anbarabad, Kerman Province
 Esfand, Sirjan, Kerman Province
 Esfand, Sistan and Baluchestan

Others 
 Espand, Peganum harmala

See also
 Esfandiyar (disambiguation)